Dato' Sri Dr. Adham bin Baba (born 6 October 1962) is a Malaysian doctor and a politician who served as Minister of Science, Technology and Innovation from 2021 to 2022. Previously, he served as Minister of Health from 2020 to 2021 and the Member of Parliament (MP) for Tenggara from 2004 to 2008 and again from 2018 to 2022, having previously been Member of the Johor State Legislative Assembly (MLA) for Parit Raja from 2008 to 2018.

Before being appointed to ministerial positions, Adham served as Parliamentary Secretary in the Ministry of Higher Education from 2004 to 2008. He is a member of the United Malays National Organisation (UMNO), a component party of the Barisan Nasional (BN) coalition.

Early life
Adham graduated with a Bachelor of Medicine and Surgery (MBBS) degree from the University of Malaya in 1987. Upon graduation, he served as a medical officer in the Ministry of Health from 1988 to 1990. In the same year, Adham began his first career as a medical doctor in the private sector in 1990 and has so to the present. He has a private clinic called Klinik Adham Sdn Bhd with 18 branches.

He also held several senior positions in government-related companies including the University of Kuala Lumpur (UniKL) Pro-Chancellor from 2013 to 2018. In addition, he had been the Chairman of UniKL Medical Services Sdn Bhd.  from 2010 to 2015.

Political career
He first became involved in politics in 1991 with the post of UMNO Committee Member for Senai Division. After that, he began to hold an important portfolio in the ministry. Among them, Special Education Officer in the Ministry of Youth and Sports from 2000 to 2004.

In 2004, he was elected as Member of Parliament for Tenggara. He was appointed as Parliamentary Secretary of the Ministry of Higher Education until 2008.

In 2008, he was elected as the State Assembly Member for Pasir Raja. He was the assemblyman of the constituency until 2018.

He contested for the Tenggara parliamentary seat in the 14th general election and won.

On 9 March 2020, he was appointed as the Minister of Health by Prime Minister Muhyiddin Yassin. The appointment is made as the country faces COVID-19 disease.

Controversies and issues

Incorrect demonstration of surgical mask use 
On 13 March 2020, Adham demonstrated the steps to how to wear a surgical mask with head ties during a televised press conference. However, he had shown an incorrect demonstration of surgical mask usage, as he had neglected to fasten the head ties of the surgical mask appropriately. He was subsequently criticized for the misleading demonstration during the televised press conference as he was the appointed Minister of Health.

Drinking warm water as a COVID-19 prevention 
On 19 March 2020, Adham advised the public that drinking warm water will help prevent COVID-19 as the virus will be flushed down to the stomach and the digestive acids will kill any virus, while being on a televised interview on RTM's Bicara Naratif programme. His remarks later went viral on social media, with many netizens questioning his claim.

Dr Nur Amalina Che Bakri had criticised Adham saying that there was no scientific evidence that the stomach's acid can kill the virus. The World Health Organization (WHO) and former deputy health minister Dr. Lee Boon Chye also refuted the claim, noting that while staying hydrated by drinking water is important for overall health, it does not prevent the Coronavirus infection, whereas Boon Chye added that "warm water that's hot enough to kill the virus will kill the patient first".

Health Director-General Dr. Noor Hisham Abdullah later refuted Adham's statement, commenting that the Health Ministry's approach for patient treatment and management is always based on scientific evidence.

Political post on Ministry of Health Facebook page 
On 15 April 2020, the official Facebook page of the Malaysian Ministry of Health shared a post from Facebook page "Friends of Adham Baba" which lauded the contributions of Adham in the COVID-19 pandemic, while claiming that the previous administration was being ineffective at dealing with the COVID-19 crisis.

The post was removed after garnering criticism from netizens, with many saying that the previous administration was not, by any chance involved in the handling of the pandemic in early 2020, and that the ministry should have remained neutral and apolitical.

"WHO conference call with 500 countries" statement 
On 18 April 2020, Adham erroneously claimed that he participated in a World Health Organization (WHO) video-conferencing session with 'over 500 countries' during a Facebook live session with UMNO President Ahmad Zahid Hamidi. Adham had also claimed that he was confident that his accomplishments as the Health Minister was recognised globally. Netizens on Twitter took notice and mocked Dr. Adham Baba for the "500 countries" claim.

The following day, he acknowledged that he misspoke about the “500 countries” when he meant to say that the videoconference had 500 participants, from 50 countries. This was later corroborated by evidence from the official Facebook page of the Malaysian Ministry of Health (MOH) which showed on 27 March, that the WHO videoconference in question almost reached 500 participants (498 participants shown in photo evidence of the Zoom videoconference organised by the WHO), one of which was the Crisis Preparedness & Response Centre (CPRC) of the MOH.

Criticism by the predecessor 
Dzulkefly Ahmad urged his successor Dr Adham Baba and the latter's two deputies to either take charge of the ministry's decision making or resign. He said many were confused by Noor Hisham's emphasis that he was just a 'messenger' and did not provide the scientific explanation behind the decision. He claimed that Malaysia had lost its political leadership. The country was running "almost automatically" since Muhyiddin's coalition overthrew the Pakatan Harapan administration in 2020. He stressed that Adham, along with his deputies Dr Noor Azmi Ghazali and Aaron Ago Dagang, must work as a team with the bureaucrats and technocrats of the Ministry of Health. "You must see, do not be afraid to be criticized. And do not just try to be praised," he said. Dr Dzulkefly said that it was the government's choice to take many of the recommendations put forward by a group of experts in an open letter addressed to Muhyiddin. The proposal includes instructing COVID-19 patients with few or no symptoms to self-quarantine at home instead of having them admitted to a hospital. "We do not actually need to use emergency regulations to 'nationalize' facilities (private hospitals) to get access to them. The Ministry of Health can load the burden on our public hospitals," he said.

Spanish Fly gaffe 
In a moment of Freudian slip on 12 July 2021, Dr Adham Baba mistakenly utters "Spanish fly" two times in reference to the Spanish Flu pandemic. In his statement, the "Spanish Fly" resulted in 1 million deaths from the years 1919 and 1916 but the COVID-19 pandemic was worse as it has resulted in 2.8 million deaths worldwide. Realising his error, he corrects "Spanish Fly" to "Spanish Virus". The correct estimated deaths from the 1918 pandemic was 20 - 50 million.

Former prime minister Mahathir Mohamad said it is unusual for a trained doctor not to know the difference between the dreaded Spanish Flu and a Spanish fly.

Personal life 
Adham was previously married to Taibah Tabrani and has 5 children, of which, 2 are adopted. On 23 April 2007, Adham's wife was suffering from asthma and fainted at her home after suffering from a respiratory problem. She was later rushed to the hospital but she died. At the time, Adham was in Auckland, New Zealand on official duty, but cut his trip short and rushed back home upon hearing the sorrowful news.

Election results

Honours
 :
  Companion Class I of the Order of Malacca (DMSM) – Datuk (2003)
  :
  Grand Knight of the Order of the Crown of Pahang (SIMP) – Dato', later Dato' Indera (2013)
  Grand Knight of the Order of Sultan Ahmad Shah of Pahang (SSAP) – Dato' Sri (2016)

References 

1962 births
Living people
People from Johor
Malaysian people of Malay descent
Malaysian general practitioners
Malaysian Muslims
United Malays National Organisation politicians
Members of the Dewan Rakyat
21st-century Malaysian politicians
Members of the Johor State Legislative Assembly